The Belfast Gazette is a newspaper of record (Government gazette) of the Government of the United Kingdom, along with The London Gazette and The Edinburgh Gazette. It is published by The Stationery Office (TSO), on behalf of His Majesty's Stationery Office (HMSO) in Belfast, Northern Ireland.

History
The Belfast Gazette was first published on 7 June 1921. Previously the same function was performed for the whole of Ireland by The Dublin Gazette, but with the partition of Ireland, a separate publication was required in Northern Ireland. The Dublin Gazette now continues in the Republic of Ireland as Iris Oifigiúil.

Publication
The Belfast Gazette is published once a week, on Fridays, and it includes official notices relating to matters of state, Parliament, the Northern Ireland Executive, the Northern Ireland Assembly, planning, transport, and public finance, as well as insolvency and bankruptcy notices.

References

External links
Official website
TSO (The Stationery Office)

1921 establishments in Northern Ireland
Government gazettes
Newspapers published in Northern Ireland
Newspapers established in 1921